Consensual tickling refers to any instance of tickling in which the party being tickled has given permission for the party providing the tickling to do so. Some people find tickling to be an erotic experience. They may prefer to be the dominant (tickling) party or the submissive (tickled) party, or they may enjoy both. Some people may prefer to be tickled in specific areas, usually erogenous zones or other particularly sensitive areas of the skin.

Terminology
Knismolagnia is the experience of "arousal from tickling".

See also 

Creep Mouse
Laughter
Tickle torture
Tag (game)

References

Further reading
Erik11. The Dom's Guide to Tickling. Aaron Brown, 2019. 
Moran, Michael. Erotic Tickling. Greenery Press, 2003. 
Courtois, Wayne. My Name is Rand. Suspect Thoughts Press, 2004. 
Courtois, Wayne. In the Time of Solution 9. Lethe Press, 2013.

External links
 Glossary of clinical sexology (it – en)

Paraphilias
Tickling
BDSM activities